Rome is an unincorporated community in Covington County, Alabama, United States.

History
The community was likely named after Rome, Georgia, which was in turn named for Rome. A post office operated under the name Rome from 1871 to 1907.

References

Unincorporated communities in Covington County, Alabama
Unincorporated communities in Alabama